Novoye Devyatkino is a village in Vsevolozhsky District of Leningrad Oblast, Russia. Population: .

References

Rural localities in Leningrad Oblast